is a former Japanese football player.

Playing career
Miyahara was born in Kitakyushu on July 19, 1980. After graduating from high school, he joined J1 League club Nagoya Grampus Eight in 1999. Although he debuted in 2000, he could hardly play in the match and left the club end of 2001 season. After 5 months blank, he joined his local club Avispa Fukuoka in J2 League. He played many matches as offensive midfielder. However he could not play at all in the match in 2004. In 2005, he moved to J2 club Sagan Tosu. He played as starting member in all matches until September. In September, he moved to J1 club Cerezo Osaka on loan. Although he played many matches as substitute in 2005, he could hardly play in the match in 2006. In June 2006, he returned to Sagan Tosu. However he could not play many matches. In June 2007, he moved to J2 club Ehime FC. After the transfer, he played full time in all matches in 2007. In 2008, although he played many matches as regular player until the middle of 2008, he could hardly play in the match in late 2008. In 2009, he moved to his local club Avispa Fukuoka for the first time in 5 years. He played many matches and retired end of 2009 season.

Club statistics

References

External links

1980 births
Living people
Association football people from Fukuoka Prefecture
Japanese footballers
J1 League players
J2 League players
Nagoya Grampus players
Avispa Fukuoka players
Sagan Tosu players
Cerezo Osaka players
Ehime FC players
Association football midfielders